The 1982 Geneva Open was a men's tennis tournament played on outdoor clay courts that was part of the 1982 Volvo Grand Prix. It was played at Geneva in Switzerland and was held from 20 September until 26 September 1982. Second-seeded Mats Wilander on the singles title.

Finals

Singles

 Mats Wilander defeated  Tomáš Šmíd 7–5, 4–6, 6–4
 It was Wilander's 3rd singles title of the year and of his career.

Doubles

 Pavel Složil /  Tomáš Šmíd defeated  Carl Limberger /  Mike Myburg 6–4, 6–0
 It was Složil's 5th title of the year and the 8th of his career. It was Šmíd's 7th title of the year and the 19th of his career.

References

External links
 ITF tournament edition details

 
20th century in Geneva